The Rezu Mare is a left tributary of the river Putna in Romania. It flows into the Putna near Tulgheș.

References

Rivers of Romania
Rivers of Harghita County